Hwangju Riverside Stadium(황주강변경기장) is a multi-use stadium in Sariwon, North Korea.  It is currently used mostly for football matches and hosts the home matches of Sariwon United.  The stadium holds 7,500 people.

See also 

 List of football stadiums in North Korea

Sports venues in North Korea
Football venues in North Korea
Buildings and structures in North Hwanghae Province
Sariwon